Aïn Boucif is a town and commune in Médéa Province, Algeria. According to the 1998 census it has a population of 24,434.

Notable people
 Samir Zaoui – professional footballer

References

Communes of Médéa Province